Nancie Atwell is an American educator who in 2015 became the first recipient of the Global Teacher Prize, a $1million award presented by the Varkey Foundation to "one innovative and caring teacher who has made an inspirational impact on their students and their community".

Career
A teacher since 1973, Atwell started her career in western New York, but found traditional teaching methods constraining.

In 1990 Atwell founded the nonprofit Center for Teaching and Learning, a school at Edgecomb in rural Maine where students read an average of 40 books a year, choose which books they read, and write prolifically. She donated the $1million from her 2015 Global Teacher Prize to the upkeep, development, and scholarships of the school, which is also a demonstration school for developing and disseminating teaching methods.

Atwell has authored nine books on teaching. In The Middle: New Understandings About Writing, Reading, and Learning (1987) has sold more than half a million copies.

Shoplifting
Nancie Atwell was apprehended on theft charges in 2016 and 2018.

Selected books
In The Middle: New Understandings About Writing, Reading, and Learning (1987).
Side by Side
Lessons That Change Writers
Naming the World: A Year of Poems and Lessons
The Reading Zone
Systems to Transform Your Classroom and School

See also
Hanan Al Hroub 2016 winner.

References

External links
Center for Teaching & Learning

Living people
American educational theorists
Educators from Maine
People from Edgecomb, Maine
20th-century American educators
21st-century American educators
American women non-fiction writers
American education writers
Women educational theorists
20th-century American non-fiction writers
20th-century American women writers
21st-century American non-fiction writers
21st-century American women writers
20th-century educational theorists
21st-century educational theorists
Year of birth missing (living people)
Recipients of the Global Teacher Prize
20th-century American women educators
21st-century American women educators